The United States Senate election of 1960 in Massachusetts was held on November 8, 1960 with Republican Incumbent Leverett Saltonstall defeating his challengers.

Democratic primary

Candidates

Declared
Edmund C. Buckley, Middlesex County Register of Deeds
Foster Furcolo, Governor of Massachusetts
Thomas J. O'Connor, Mayor of Springfield

Withdrew
Edmund Dinis, District Attorney

Campaign
Governor Foster Furcolo, who lost to Saltonstall in 1954, decided to run against him again in 1960.

On June 15, 1960, Springfield Mayor Thomas J. O'Connor announced he would challenge Furcolo for the Democratic nomination. O'Connor received support from Democrats who were opposed to Furcolo's effort to enact a state sales tax. Edmund Dinis, District Attorney for the southern district, was briefly in the race, but dropped at the party convention to support O'Connor. In a show of unity, Furcolo was nominated at the convention by Massachusetts Senate President and political foe John E. Powers. Furcolo defeated O'Connor by a 3 to 1 margin at the Democratic State Convention, but O'Connor decided to remain in the race. In the primary, O'Connor upset Furcolo 48% to 39% with Southern Middlesex County Register of Deeds Edmund C. Buckley received the remaining 13%. O'Connor was able to sweep the western part of the state and top Furcolo by 10,000 in Boston.

Results

General election

Campaign
During the general election, O'Connor contrasted his youth to Saltonstall's age, calling him "yesterday's senator" and "The Late George Apley of Massachusetts politics". O'Connor also attacked the senator for "fail[ing] to act for the working man" and for helping "big business brigands" destroy the state's textile industry. 

Saltonstall ran on his long record of public service. He criticized O'Connor for stating that he would consider continue serving as Springfield mayor if elected to the Senate, arguing that Americans need "not part-time leadership but full leadership". 

Saltonstall also criticized O'Connor's campaign for lacking substance. After refusing to debate O'Connor, Saltonstall stated "If my opponent would express his opinions of some of the vital national and international issues, I would then consider whether I would debate on these subjects or not".

Results
Saltonstall defeated O'Connor 1,358,556 votes to 1,050,725 to hold on to his Senate seat.

References

Massachusetts
1960
1960 Massachusetts elections